Malyavan is a character in Hindu mythology, appearing in the epic Ramayana. A rakshasa, he is the son of Sukesha, and the brother of Mālī and Sumālī. He is described to be a major counsellor to the King of Lanka, Ravana, along with also being the latter's maternal grandfather.

Ramayana 
Malyavan is against his grandson's war with Prince Rama, and attempts in vain to convince Ravana to let go to Sita; however, this counsel is rejected by Ravana:

After the death of Ravana, Malyavan maintains his position and becomes the chief counsellor of Vibhishana, Ravana's younger brother, and Malyavan's third grandson.

Malyavan's wife is Sundari, who is often stated to be beautiful. She bears him seven sons: Vajramusthi, Virupaksha, Durmukha, Suptaghna, Yajnakopa, Matta, and Unmatta, and one daughter, Anala.

Ramakien
Malyavan is known as Thao Mali Warat (ท้าวมาลีวราช) in Ramakien, the version of the Ramayana in Thailand. He is the old brother of Thao Latsadian, the grandfather of Ravana of Lanka, and is considered to have the reputation of Brahma as a paragon of justice. Ravana invites him to judge the case of his abduction of Sita, hoping that he would rule in his favour, but the counsellor investigates all relevant witnesses with fairness, and draws up an order to return Sita to Rama. Ravana does not agree with this ruling and offends him, and therefore he curses that Ravana would die by the bow and arrow of Rama.

References

Rakshasa in the Ramayana
Epic poems in Thai
Works based on the Ramayana
Thai folklore
Legendary Thai people
Thai deities